Marc Lievens (born 16 July 1948) is a Belgian racing cyclist. He rode in the 1970 Tour de France.

References

External links
 

1948 births
Living people
Belgian male cyclists
Place of birth missing (living people)
20th-century Belgian people